Nataša Vojnović (Serbian Cyrillic: Наташа Војновић) is a Bosnian Serb supermodel, who participated in the Elite Model Look of 1996.

Early life
Nataša was born on 28 August 1979 in Brčko, SFR Yugoslavia. At the age of 12, she fled from the war in Bosnia and moved to Belgrade, Serbia.

Elite Model Look and Career
Vojnović entered the Elite Model Look of FR Yugoslavia in 1996. She won the semifinals, earning her the right to represent her country during the finals in Nice, France. She enter in the Top 15 in the final, but lost to Ukrainian contestant Diana Kovalchuk.

She started her modeling job when she signed with NEXT Model Management in 1999. She was then ushered to Paris and Milan to make her first fashion show appearance in the Spring Fendi and Balenciaga shows. Her first campaign was for Chanel Accessories, shot by Karl Lagerfeld. Her career continued to build momentum, booking editorials for Vogue Italia, i-D (her first magazine cover), and was twice on the cover of British Vogue. In 2000, Nataša signed a contract with Calvin Klein, after she dyed her original blonde hair for red locks. She continued her career, booking campaigns for Aquascutum, Blumarine, Chanel, Gucci, Stella McCartney, Sonia Rykiel, and Yves Saint Laurent. She also has walked the runway for international designers like Christian Dior and Christian Lacroix. In 2010, 2012 and 2014, Vojnović appeared on the cover of Serbian Elle.

References

External links

1979 births
Living people
People from Brčko District
Bosnia and Herzegovina female models
Serbian female models
Serbs of Bosnia and Herzegovina
Serb models
Yugoslav Wars refugees
Bosnia and Herzegovina emigrants to Serbia